Arthur Elmer Albert Townsend (October 9, 1905 – August 5, 1971) was a Canadian professional ice hockey player who played five games in the National Hockey League for the Chicago Black Hawks during the 1926–27 season and 29 games in the Western Hockey League with the Portland Rosebuds during the 1925–26 season. The rest of his career, which lasted from 1923 to 1939, was spent in various minor leagues. He was born in Souris, Manitoba.

Career statistics

Regular season and playoffs

External links
 

1905 births
1971 deaths
Canadian expatriate ice hockey players in the United States
Canadian ice hockey defencemen
Chicago Blackhawks players
Edmonton Eskimos (ice hockey) players
Ice hockey people from Manitoba
London Tecumsehs players
People from Souris, Manitoba
Portland Rosebuds players
Seattle Eskimos players
Springfield Indians players
Tulsa Oilers (AHA) players
Winnipeg Maroons players